This electoral calendar for the year 2003 lists the national/federal direct elections to be held in 2003 in the de jure and de facto sovereign states. By-elections are excluded, though national referendums are included.

January
5 January: Lithuania, President (second round)
10 January: Djibouti, Parliament
22 January: Netherlands, Parliament
28 January: Israel, Parliament

February
9 February: 
Monaco, Parliament
Montenegro, President
16 February: Cyprus, President
19 February: Armenia, President (first round)

March
2 March: Estonia, Parliament
5 March: 
Syria, Parliament
Belize, Parliament
Armenia, President
8 March: Elections in Malta, Referendum
16 March: 
Finland, Parliament
El Salvador, Parliament
30 March: Benin, Parliament

April
12 April: Nigeria, Parliament 
13 April: Malta, Parliament
14 April Somaliland, President
19 April: Nigeria, President
27 April: 
Yemen, Parliament
Argentina, President (Country-wide) and Chamber of Deputies (La Rioja and Santiago del Estero)
Paraguay, President

May
9 May: Kiribati, Parliament
10 May: Iceland, Iceland 
11 May: Montenegro, President
18 May: Belgium, 2003 Belgian federal election
25 may: Armenia, Parliament

June
1 June: Togo, President
13-14 June: Czech Republic, Referendum
17 June: Jordan, Parliament

July
4 July: Kiribati, President
5 July: Kuwait, Parliament
27 July: Cambodia, Parliament

August
3 August: North Korea, Parliament
24 August: Argentina, Chamber of Deputies (Buenos Aires City)
25 August: Rwanda, Parliament
31 August: Argentina, Chamber of Deputies (Río Negro)

September
7 September: Argentina, Chamber of Deputies and Senate (Santa Fe)
14 September: Argentina, Chamber of Deputies (Buenos Aires, Chaco, Jujuy and Santa Cruz)
19-20 September: Swaziland, Parliament (first round)
28 September: Argentina, Chamber of Deputies (Misiones and Neuquén)
29 September-2 October: Rwanda,  Parliament

October
4 October: Oman, Parliament
5 October: Argentina, Chamber of Deputies (Córdoba and San Juan) and Senate (Córdoba)
15 October: Azerbaijan, President
17 October: Maldives, Parliament
18-19 October: Swaziland, Parliament (second round)
19 October: Argentina, Chamber of Deputies (Formosa)
19 October: Åland, Parliament
26 October: Argentina, Chamber of Deputies and Senate (Catamarca, La Pampa, Mendoza and Tucumán)

November
2 November: 
Georgia, Parliament
Georgia, Referendum
7 November: Mauritania, President
9 November: 
Argentina, Chamber of Deputies and Senate (Chubut)
Japan, Parliament
Guatemala, President (first round)
16 November: Argentina, Chamber of Deputies (Salta)
17 November: Marshall Islands, Parliament
23 November:
Argentina, Chamber of Deputies (Corrientes, Entre Ríos, San Luis and Tierra del Fuego) and Senate (Corrientes)
Croatia, Parliament
28 November: Gibraltar, Parliament

December
7 December: Russia, Parliament
15 December: Northern Cyprus, Parliament
21 December: Guinea, President
28 December: 
Serbia, Parliament
 Guatemala, President (second round)

Unknown

 
Political timelines of the 2000s by year